"Laura Palmer" is a song by British band Bastille. It is the fifth single from their debut studio album Bad Blood, and the follow-up to their hit single "Pompeii". The song was originally released in 2011 as a track from their self-released EP of the same name (along with the tracks "Overjoyed", "Things We Lost in the Fire" and "Get Home"). It was re-released as its own digital download on 2 June 2013. It peaked at number 42 on the UK Singles Chart. The song took its name from the character in David Lynch and Mark Frost's TV series Twin Peaks.

Critical reception
Lewis Corner of Digital Spy gave the song a positive review stating:

The track is immersed in inspiration from the popular show – from the blood-racing beats, to the haunting echoes. [...] The final result not only serves as an ear-friendly ode to Twin Peaks, but is sure to strengthen Bastille's very own cult following even more.

Music video
A music video to accompany the release of "Laura Palmer" was first released onto YouTube on 11 April 2013 at a total length of three minutes and twenty-one seconds. In the video, which depicts a vague and bizarre story where group leader Dan Smith is kidnapped and released within less than two minutes, four people wear rubber masks. Toward the end, after being released, Smith is given a rubber mask; Smith dons the mask and removes it after a few seconds.

The version of the song used in the video is unique to it because of a sudden and unexpected interruption in the music. During the scene where Smith is kidnapped, which is shown as a camcorder shot, there is a jump-cut – as in a badly edited VHS tape – to a completely unrelated shot of a dog howling, also shot with a camcorder, and the song stops in the middle of the second chorus (the dog had already appeared in the video but with no accompanying audio). After five seconds, the video cuts back to a more neutral point-of-view shot and the song resumes.

Track listing
Digital download
 "Laura Palmer" – 3:06
 "Thinkin Bout You"  – 3:05
 "Laura Palmer" (RAC Mix) – 3:11
 "Laura Palmer" (Imagine Dragons Remix) – 3:49
 "Laura Palmer" (Kat Krazy Remix) – 3:32

7" vinyl
 "Laura Palmer"
 "Thinkin Bout You"

In popular culture
In 2012, an alternate version of the song was included in The Sims 3 on the in-game Dark Wave radio station.

Charts

Weekly charts

Year-end charts

Certifications

Release history

References

2013 singles
2013 songs
Bastille (band) songs
Virgin Records singles
Twin Peaks